Sabaskong Bay 35D is a First Nations reserve on Kakagi Lake near Sioux Narrows-Nestor Falls, Ontario. It is the main reserve of the Ojibways of Onigaming First Nation.

References

Saulteaux reserves in Ontario
Communities in Rainy River District